The 3 arrondissements of the Guyane department are:
 Arrondissement of Cayenne (prefecture of the Guyane department: Cayenne), with 10 communes.  The population of the arrondissement was 177,716 in 2019.  
 Arrondissement of Saint-Laurent-du-Maroni (subprefecture: Saint-Laurent-du-Maroni), with 8 communes.  The population of the arrondissement was 96,757 in 2019.
 Arrondissement of Saint-Georges (subprefecture: Saint-Georges), with 4 communes.  The population of the arrondissement was 7,205 in 2019. This arrondissement was created by a government decree of October 26, 2022.

History

At the creation of the department of Guyane in 1947, its only arrondissement was Cayenne. The arrondissement of Inini, containing the previously unincorporated inland territory of French Guiana, was created in 1951. In 1969 the arrondissement of Inini was disbanded, and the territory of French Guiana was divided between the arrondissement of Cayenne and the new arrondissement of Saint-Laurent-du-Maroni. In October 2022, the arrondissement of Saint-Georges was created by detaching from the arrondissement of Cayenne 4 communes of the Oyapock River valley bordering Brazil, in order to bring French central state services closer to this area located nearly 200 km from Cayenne.

See also
Cantons of the Guyane department
Communes of the Guyane department

References

Guyane
 
French Guiana 1